Anna Ciundziewicka (née Prószyński; 18 July 1803 – 18 April 1850) was an early household and recipe advice writer of Polish ethnicity. She wrote "The Housekeeper of Lithuania" (Gospodyni litewska) in the Polish language.

Life

She was the daughter of Michał Prószyński of the Ogończyk coat of arms, subcamerarius of Minsk, and Tekla née Wolański. Her sister Michalina married Hipolit Siemiradzki; their son was the painter Henryk Siemiradzki.

She was educated at a boarding school in Vilnius. In 1826, she married into the Ciundziewicki family.

In 1848 she published "The Housekeeper of Lithuania" (Gospodyni litewska) in Vilnius.

She died in 1850, and was buried at her family's chapel.

References

1803 births
1850 deaths
19th-century Polish women writers
Women cookbook writers
Polish food writers